Malcolm Craddock (2 August 1938 – 15 August 2015) was a British producer known for the television series Sharpe.

He is buried on the eastern side of Highgate Cemetery. His gravestone incorrectly states the year of his death as 2016.

References

External links

1938 births
2015 deaths
Burials at Highgate Cemetery
Film producers from London